Khirbet et-Tibbâneh (Hurvat Tibneh / Kh.

The site is thought to have formerly borne the name Timnath (distinct from the Tel Batash-Timnah site associated with the biblical story of Samson in the lower foothills of Judea along the Sorek valley). Khirbet et-Tibbaneh or Timnah is perched upon a high mountain ridge rising up from the Elah valley and is where the episode of Judah and Tamar is thought to have taken place.

Etymology
Orientalists, Clermont-Ganneau and Edward Robinson, have made a point in showing the etymological Hebrew origins of certain Arabic place-names, saying that the Hebrew place-name Timnah was to be recognised in the Arabic corruption, Tibneh or Tibna. John William McGarvey (1829–1911) who quotes Conder on the linguistic evidence of the name says that, in Arabic, "the substitution of B for M is so common (as in Tibneh for Timnah)..." Both names have been preserved in the respective sites.

Site and identification
In ancient Jewish classical literature, two distinct sites in the land of Judah bore the name Timnath (Timnah). The Book of Joshua records the names of two towns, both in the tribal inheritance of Judah and having the identical name of Timnath; the one Timnath (Josh. 15:10) being transcribed alongside the name of Beit Shemesh, while the other Timnath (Josh. 15:57) being transcribed alongside the name of Gibeah (of Judah), a town said to be Jab'a. The Jerusalem Talmud (Sotah 1:8) relates the following tradition: "Rav has said: There were two Timnaths; one mentioned in connection with Judah, and the other mentioned in connection with Samson." The Talmudic exegetes have explained that Samson, who lived in the hilltop town of Zorah near Beit Shemesh, is said to have 'gone down' to Timnath, but Judah is said to have 'gone up' to Timnath. Kh. et-Tibbâneh is thought to be the Timnath (Timnah) mentioned in connection with Judah and Tamar (Genesis 38: 13, 14), although this view remains inconclusive.

Khirbet et Tibbaneh (Tibna) was visited by Palestine Exploration Fund explorers, Conder and Kitchener, in the late 19th-century, where they described the ruin as follows: "Timnah - A town of Judah (Josh.  XV. 57), mentioned with Gibeah. There is a ruin called Tibna near Jeb'a, in the higher hills of ʾArkûb, distinct from Tibneh (Sheet XVI), which represents the Timnah of Joshua XV.10."

Others are unsure of its identification, since the site has yet to be fully excavated.

Site's description
The ancient ruin sits on a high mountain ridge about 2 kilometers west of Khirbet Sanasin. On its site is found the remnant of a square Iron Age fortress which apparently offered security along the route from the valley of Elah to Betar and to Jerusalem. The area of the fortress is 30 x 30 meters (98 x 98 feet), where two walls made of fieldstones and ashlar masonry still remain, whose hollowed spaces were filled-in with smaller stones. Amihai Mazar suggests that the structure served as either a fortress or an administrative center, and most likely manned by a garrison to secure the roads between the major towns of the Shephelah and the string of settlements along the edge of the hill region.

The mound is almost entirely strewn with razed boulders, and ancillary walls, partially standing, are to be seen on the ruin. The valley seemed to have been used for horticulture in ages past. Sherds dot the landscape, with occasional carob trees, oaks and buckthorns. Near the site is a modern-day quarry and two ancient cisterns. In close proximity to Khirbet et-Tibbaneh is the old military patrol road, leading from Tzur Hadassah to Aviezer.

History
Khirbet et-Tibbaneh (Tibna) is thought to be the "Tapuna" mentioned in the list of Thothmes III.

Israeli archaeologist Avi-Yonah also thinks the site to have been the Timnah (Thamnatha) mentioned in the First Book of Maccabees (and later mentioned by Josephus), one of several places fortified by Bacchides in ca. 160 BCE after the death of Judas Maccabeus. Others suggest that the account in Maccabees may refer to another Timna (Thamnatha), that called Kh. Tibne in south-western Samaria, in Mount Ephraim, about 14 kilometers (9 miles) northwest of Bethel.

It is generally accepted that the Mishnaic scholar, Simeon of Timnah, was born and raised in one of the two Timnahs during the waning years of the Second Temple period, based on the vowels assigned to his name,. He is noted for saying: "A bastard is anyone who is born from an [illegal] union for which his parents are liable to kareth." (Mishnah Yebamot 4:13; Babylonian Talmud, Yebamot 49a), and which teaching comes to exclude a single parent who gave birth to a child outside of wedlock, and whose child is often wrongly called "bastard" under common law.

Archaeological finds
As of 2018, the site at Kh. Tibbaneh has yet to be excavated. The site was surveyed by Dani Weiss, Boaz Zissu and Gideon Solimany of the Israel Antiquities Authority, during which survey they discovered the segment of an ancient road (200 m. long, 2.5 m. wide). A cursory review of the site has revealed late Iron II sherds.

Gallery

References

Bibliography

Clermont-Ganneau, C. (1875), The Site of the City of Adullam, Palestine Exploration Fund Quarterly Statement 7.3 (July), pp. 168–177

 (Hebrew)
 

 (Hebrew)

External links
Survey of Western Palestine, 1880 Map, Map 17: IAA, Wikimedia commons 

Historic Jewish communities
Ancient villages in Israel
Ancient Jewish settlements of Judaea
Former populated places in Israel
District of Jerusalem
Archaeological sites in Israel
Canaanite cities
Biblical geography
Iron Age sites in Israel
Ancient Israel and Judah
Hebrew Bible cities
Tells (archaeology)
Biblical cities
Valley of Elah